Jiquilpan de Juárez is a town of about 15,000 residents in northwest Michoacán, Mexico, near the border with the states of Colima and Jalisco. It is the seat of the municipio of Jiquilpan and the birthplace of President Lázaro Cárdenas (1934–40). The city is home to the Centro de Estudios de la Revolución Mexicana Lázaro Cárdenas and the Instituto Tecnológico de Jiquilpan.

Populated places in Michoacán